Bill Goss may refer to:

Bill Goss (author), American author
Bill Goss (singer), member of the boyband The Choirboys

See also
William Goss (disambiguation)